Marco Antonio "Chemo" Ruíz Torres (born 26 September 1979 ) is a Peruvian footballer who plays as a midfielder. He currently plays for Sport Victoria.

Club career
Ruiz started his senior career with Sport Coopsol Trujillo, making his Torneo Descentralizado debut in the 2001 season. He only managed to make one league appearance in his time in Trujillo.

In July 2001 he joined Deportivo Wanka for the second half the season. He made 3 league appearances for his new club to wrap up his debut season in the top flight. In his second season there he was a regular starter with 42 league games played. However his club could not avoid relegation at the end of the 2002 Descentralizado season.

In January 2003 Ruiz joined Coronel Bolognesi FC.

International career
Ruiz was called up for his debut match for the Peru national team by Paulo Autuori. His debut was on 27 August 2003 at home in a 0-0 friendly match against Guatemala.

References

External links

1979 births
Living people
Footballers from Lima
Peruvian footballers
Peru international footballers
Peruvian Primera División players
Sport Coopsol Trujillo footballers
Coronel Bolognesi footballers
Club Deportivo Wanka footballers
Sport Boys footballers
Sport Áncash footballers
Club Universitario de Deportes footballers
Total Chalaco footballers
Ayacucho FC footballers
Unión Comercio footballers
José Gálvez FBC footballers
Deportivo Coopsol players
Sport Victoria players
Unión Huaral footballers
Association football midfielders